Electricity generation in Laos is produced by one coal-fired power plant and several hydroelectric dams. 53% of power generated in 2016 came from renewable sources. The majority of power produced from the Honsa plant is exported to Thailand. The Xayaburi run-of-river dam is expected to generate over 7,000 GWh of electricity per year, which will mainly be exported to Thailand as part of the development of an interconnected Southeast Asian energy market.

Thermal

Hydroelectric

References 

 Ministry of Energy and Mines - Power Projects (archived)

Laos
Power stations in Laos
Power stations